Neville Chamberlain formed the Chamberlain war ministry in 1939 after declaring war on Germany. Chamberlain led the country for the first eight months of the Second World War, until the Norway Debate in Parliament led Chamberlain to resign and Winston Churchill to form a new ministry.

History

On 3 September 1939, Neville Chamberlain, Prime Minister of the United Kingdom, reconstructed his existing government so as to be suited for the Second World War. The most dramatic change to the ministerial line-up saw the return of Winston Churchill as First Lord of the Admiralty. Other changes included Lord Caldecote replacing Lord Maugham as Lord Chancellor, Sir John Anderson replacing Sir Samuel Hoare as Home Secretary (Hoare became Lord Privy Seal with a wide-ranging brief) and the return of Anthony Eden to the government as Secretary of State for Dominion Affairs. However, the administration was not a true national unity government as it was made up primarily of Conservatives with support from some National Labour and National Liberal members. There were no representatives from the Labour Party or Liberal Party.

The government was notable for having a small War Cabinet consisting of only the principal and service ministers, with most other government positions serving outside the Cabinet. The War Cabinet included Chamberlain, Hoare, Chancellor of the Exchequer Sir John Simon, Foreign Secretary Lord Halifax, Churchill, Secretary of State for Air Sir Kingsley Wood, Minister for Coordination of Defence Lord Chatfield, Lord Hankey (as Minister without Portfolio) and Secretary of State for War Leslie Hore-Belisha. Oliver Stanley replaced Hore-Belisha in January 1940 while Chatfield left the war cabinet in April 1940.

The government ended on 10 May 1940 when Chamberlain resigned and was succeeded by Winston Churchill who formed the War Coalition.

Cabinet

War Cabinet, September 1939 – May 1940

Upon the outbreak of the war, Chamberlain carried out a fullscale reconstruction of the government and introduced a small War Cabinet who were as follows:
Neville Chamberlain – Prime Minister and Leader of the House of Commons
Sir Samuel Hoare – Lord Privy Seal
Sir John Simon – Chancellor of the Exchequer
Lord Halifax – Secretary of State for Foreign Affairs
Leslie Hore-Belisha – Secretary of State for War
Sir Kingsley Wood – Secretary of State for Air
Winston Churchill – First Lord of the Admiralty
Lord Chatfield – Minister for Coordination of Defence
Lord Hankey – Minister without Portfolio

Changes
January 1940 – Oliver Stanley succeeds Leslie Hore-Belisha as Secretary of State for War.
April 1940 – Hoare swaps Lord Privy Seal with Wood for Secretary of State for Air. Lord Chatfield leaves the Government and the office of Minister for Coordination of Defence is abolished.

Key office holders not in the Cabinet
Lord Caldecote – Lord Chancellor
Lord Stanhope – Lord President of the Council and Leader of the House of Lords
Sir John Anderson – Secretary of State for the Home Department
Malcolm MacDonald – Secretary of State for the Colonies
Anthony Eden – Secretary of State for Dominion Affairs
Lord Zetland – Secretary of State for India and Burma
John Colville – Secretary of State for Scotland
Oliver Stanley – President of the Board of Trade
Lord De La Warr – President of the Board of Education
Sir Reginald Dorman-Smith – Minister of Agriculture
Ernest Brown – Minister of Labour and National Service
Walter Elliot – Minister of Health
Euan Wallace – Minister of Transport
Leslie Burgin – Minister of Supply
William Shepherd Morrison – Minister of Food and Chancellor of the Duchy of Lancaster
Herwald Ramsbotham – First Commissioner of Works
Lord Macmillan – Minister of Information
Ronald Cross – Minister of Economic Warfare
Sir Walter Womersley – Minister of Pensions
George Tryon – Postmaster General
Lord Winterton – Paymaster-General
Sir Donald Somervell – Attorney General
Sir Terence O'Connor – Solicitor General
David Margesson – Chief Whip

Changes
October 1939 – The position of Minister of Shipping is created, with Sir John Gilmour the first holder.
November 1939 – Lord Winterton resigns as Paymaster-General and no successor is appointed.
January 1940 – Oliver Stanley becomes Secretary of State for War and a member of the War Cabinet in succession to Leslie Hore-Belisha (resigned) (see above) and is succeeded as President of the Board of Trade by Andrew Duncan. Lord Macmillan resigns as Minister of Information and is succeeded by Sir John Reith.
April 1940 – Robert Hudson succeeds Sir John Gilmour (deceased) as Minister of Shipping. Lord De La Warr exchanges President of the Board of Education with Herwald Ramsbotham for First Commissioner of Works. William Shepherd Morrison swaps the Chancellor of the Duchy of Lancaster for the Postmaster General with George Tryon and is succeeded as Minister of Food by Lord Woolton.
May 1940 – Sir Terence O'Connor dies and no new Solicitor General is appointed before the government falls.

List of ministers
Members of the Cabinet are in bold face.

References
D. Butler and G. Butler, Twentieth Century British Political Facts 1900–2000.

1930s in the United Kingdom
1939 establishments in the United Kingdom
1940 disestablishments in the United Kingdom
1940s in the United Kingdom
British ministries
Cabinets disestablished in 1940
Cabinets established in 1939
Coalition governments of the United Kingdom
Grand coalition governments
Government
 
Ministries of George VI
Ministry 2
United Kingdom in World War II-related lists
United Kingdom in World War II